Grangetown is an area in the borough of Redcar and Cleveland, North Yorkshire, England.

A ward covering the area had a population of 5,088 at the 2011 census. It is part of Greater Eston, which includes the area and the other centres of Eston, Normanby, South Bank, Teesville and part of Ormesby.

History

The development of Grangetown was the discovery of ironstone in the Eston Hills in 1840, and the further development of the iron and steel industry along the riverbanks by Messrs. Bolckow and Vaughan from 1881. The name of the village was taken from a farm nearby called Eston Grange, formerly a working farm for the monks of Guisborough Priory.

By 1914, it was community of around 5,500 people with most houses lying between Bolckow Road and the steel works. There was a market square, shopping centre, boarding school, three pubs, six places of worship, a police station and public bathhouse. The Church of St Matthew, which was built in 1901, was demolished in 1979 and replaced with another building, the St Hilda of Whitby Church. Though the inhabitants came from many parts of the country, the community had built up a strong identity and local pride. The majority of men worked in the steel works, but a wide range of skills was represented within the area and a whole cross-section of society lived together in the area. In 1906, a power station was built near the railway station, which was the first in the world to generate at 11,000 volts. It closed in 1937  and was demolished in 1969.

Grangetown had a period of expansion between 1914 and 1939. Both the steel companies and the Eston Urban District council built estates from Bolckow Road to and across the new A1085 Trunk Road, with the steel company Bolckow Vaughan expanding their housing under the name of Grangetown Garden Village. The population in 1939 was approximately 9,000. After the war, council house building was extended and in the 1950s reached Fabian Road.

The modern centre is on Birchington Avenue, the move in part due to the A66, which built through the area in the 1980s, and ends at a roundabout in the east of Grangetown. Victorian terraced-houses, near heavy industry along the River Tees have been replaced with warehouses and depots of lighter industry. Some new houses have been built over the years with most of its original Victorian architecture lost.

Governance
It was historically part of the ancient Langbaurgh Wapentake in the Cleveland area of Yorkshire in its North Riding. The ancient parish of Ormesby was split into civil parishes, the area became part of the Eston parish. The civil parish developed into the Eston Urban District. The district was merged into County Borough of Teesside in 1968 until 1974. The area was then placed into the Borough of Langbaurgh's County of Cleveland until 1988 when it became the Borough of Langbaurgh-on-Tees, which became the present Unitary Authority of Redcar and Cleveland.

Politics

Grangetown is part of Redcar constituency, and is represented by Conservative Member Jacob Young in the House of Commons.

2019 local elections results

Borough Council 

In the 2019 local elections, the following members were returned to Redcar and Cleveland Borough Council:

Notable people
Eddie Latheron (1887–1917), Blackburn Rovers and England footballer
William Henry Short V.C. (1884–1916), footballer and Battle of the Somme VC recipient
Horace King, Baron Maybray-King (1901–1986), former Labour Party MP and Speaker of the House of Commons
Wally K. Daly (1940–2020), television and radio writer
Alan Keen (1937–2011), former Labour Party MP
Roy Chubby Brown (born Roy Vasey, 1945) stand up comedian

See also
 Eston
 Normanby
 Teesville

References

Sources

External links

 Grangetown in Past Times
 Genuki - History of Eston parish & District Descriptions from Bulmer's History and Directory of North Yorkshire (1890). Retrieved 8 February 2006

Places in the Tees Valley
Redcar and Cleveland
Villages in North Yorkshire
Greater Eston